Louis, Prince of Hesse and by Rhine (Ludwig Hermann Alexander Chlodwig, 20 November 1908 – 30 May 1968) was the youngest son of Ernest Louis, Grand Duke of Hesse by his second wife, Princess Eleonore of Solms-Hohensolms-Lich. He was a great-grandson of Queen Victoria.

He succeeded his brother Georg Donatus, the last Hereditary Grand Duke of Hesse, as head of the formerly grand ducal House of Hesse-Darmstadt after Georg Donatus' premature death. Louis married Margaret Campbell Geddes, daughter of Auckland Campbell Geddes, 1st Baron Geddes in 1937, on the day after the Sabena OO-AUB Ostend crash, in which his mother, brother, sister-in-law, and nephews were all killed on the way to the wedding.  They had no issue. After the death of his older brother, he adopted his niece, Johanna (b. 1936), but the little girl died in 1939.

Louis studied archeology and art history and became attaché at the German Embassy in London. During World War II, Louis was drafted into military service. Soon after, however, he was eliminated from the Wehrmacht along with other members of formerly ruling houses, because of “political unreliability” according to the Prinzenerlass, although he had joined the Nazi party as a precaution to protect his position and property. He then withdrew to his estate Schloss Wolfsgarten near Frankfurt with his wife, who aroused suspicion because of her British origins. They made Wolfsgarten available as a military hospital of the German Red Cross during the Second World War. Louis and his wife took care of the younger children of Philipp, Landgrave of Hesse, after the latter had been arrested first by the Nazis and then by U.S. forces while his wife Mafalda had died in the Buchenwald concentration camp after it was bombed by the Allies.

After the end of World War II, the couple got involved in the reconstruction of Darmstadt, in art, museums and charitable institutions such as the Alice Hospital, the Eleonora Home and the German Red Cross on whose board Margaret was a member for two decades from 1958.

His sister-in-law Cecilie of Hesse, Princess of Greece and Denmark who had died in the plane crash was a sister of Prince Philip, Duke of Edinburgh. As a result, a close friendship developed between the royal couple, Elizabeth II and her husband Philip, and the Hessians. They are credited with helping the British royal family reestablish connections with their German relations after World War II. The royal couple paid a visit to Louis (called Lu) and Margaret (called Peg) at their home in Wolfsgarten on 20 May 1965.<ref>Visit by Elizabeth II and Prince Philip to Wolfsgarten Castle, 20 May 1965</ref>

As a lover of classical music, he promoted the Ansbach Festival and the Aldeburgh Festival. He translated texts for his friend Benjamin Britten (191376) and had the English composer come to Wolfsgarten, where parts of his opera Death in Venice, published in 1973, were written. He introduced Britten to the poetry of Friedrich Hölderlin (17701843). Britten dedicated his 1958 song cycle Sechs Hölderlin-Fragmente'' to the Prince.

In 1964, he stood as godfather to Prince Edward. In 1960, Prince Louis adopted his distant cousin, Moritz, Landgrave of Hesse. With the death of Prince Louis in Frankfurt in 1968, he was succeeded by Moritz's father, Philipp, Landgrave of Hesse (d. 1980) as head of the house. Moritz (d. 2013) in turn was succeeded by his son, Donatus (b. 1966).

Ancestry

References 

1908 births
1968 deaths
House of Hesse-Darmstadt
Burials at the Mausoleum for the Grand Ducal House of Hesse, Rosenhöhe (Darmstadt)
Sons of monarchs